Podops is a genus of Palaearctic bugs, in the family Pentatomidae; it is the type genus of the subfamily Podopinae and tribe Podopini.  Species are recorded from Europe and includes the type species P. inunctus, which can be found in the British Isles.

Species
BioLib lists the following:
Subgenus Opocrates Horváth, 1883 
 Podops annulicornis Jakovlev, 1877
 Podops curvidens A. Costa, 1843
 Podops rectidens Horváth, 1883
Subgenus Petalodera Horváth, 1883 
 Podops buccatus Horváth, 1883
 Podops dilatata Fieber in Puton, 1873
 Podops tangirus (Fabricius, 1803)
Subgenus Podops Laporte de Castelnau, 1833 
 Podops calligerus Horváth, 1887
 Podops inunctus (Fabricius, 1775) (synonym P. inuncta)type species (as Cimex inunctus Fabricius, 1775)
 Podops retowskii Horváth, 1883

References

External Links
British Bugs: Podops inuncta Turtle Shieldbug (retrieved 31 October 2021)

Pentatomidae
Pentatomomorpha genera
Hemiptera of Europe